The 1949 Denver Pioneers football team was an American football team that represented the University of Denver as a member of the Skyline Six Conference during the 1949 college football season. In their second season under head coach Johnny Baker, the Pioneers compiled a 4–6 record (2–2 against conference opponents), finished third in the Skyline Six, and were outscored by a total of 214 to 192.

Schedule

References

Denver
Denver Pioneers football seasons
Denver Pioneers football